Gorni Lipovikj is a village in the municipality of Konče, North Macedonia.

Demographics
The population in 1900 was 420. The population in 1905 was 548.

According to the 2002 census, the village had a total of 163 inhabitants. Ethnic groups in the village include:

Macedonians 162
Serbs 1

References

Villages in Konče Municipality